William George Skillan (3 October 1893 in Woodford, London, England – March 1975 in Stratford-on-Avon, Warwickshire, England) was a British stage, television and film actor.

Selected filmography
Film
 The Merchant of Venice (1916)
 Dreyfus (1931)
 The First of the Few (1942)
 The Day Will Dawn (1942)

Television
 David Copperfield (1956, 5 episodes)

References

External links
 

1893 births
1975 deaths
English male film actors
English male silent film actors
20th-century English male actors
English male television actors
20th-century British male actors